Mohammad Zainoden Panganting Bato was a Moro revolutionary and politician. He was a member of the Moro Islamic Liberation Front (MILF) and the Interim Bangsamoro Parliament.

A native of Piagapo, Lanao del Sur and educated at the Al-Azhar University in Cairo, Egypt, Bato was among the founding members of the Moro Islamic Liberation Front (MILF) in the 1960s. He became the head of the group's central committee and its Mujlis as-Shura or consultative council.

After the establishment of the Bangsamoro autonomous region in 2019, he became part of the Interim Bangsamoro Parliament as one of the 41 nominees of the MILF. He co-authored at least 13 legislative bills and was part of five committees.

He died in office on August 15, 2021 at age 76.

References

1940s births
2021 deaths
Filipino Muslims
People from Lanao del Sur
Members of the Bangsamoro Transition Authority Parliament
Year of birth missing
Al-Azhar University alumni
Filipino Islamists
Filipino expatriates in Egypt
Moro Islamic Liberation Front members